Julian E. Buesink (September 24, 1921 – September 23, 1998) was the car owner and crew chief during Bill Rexford's 1950 NASCAR Grand National Series championship run and his teammate Lloyd Moore. 

Buesink's cars competed in 156 NASCAR races with two wins, both coming in 1950 with drivers Bill Rexford and Lloyd Moore respectively. His team scored 64 Top 10 finishes. He had nine different drivers from 1951 to 1953, before Bob Duell came on board from 1956 and 1960. He ended his career as an owner with future three time champion Cale Yarborough. Yarborough made 7 starts in Buesink equipment from 1961 to 1963. He drove in his own car once in 1951, starting seventeenth and finishing twenty seventh at Thompson Speedway Motorsports Park. 

He was a resident of Findley Lake, New York, where he owned and operated an automobile dealership.

Motorsports career results

NASCAR
(key) (Bold – Pole position awarded by qualifying time. Italics – Pole position earned by points standings or practice time. * – Most laps led.)

Grand National Series

References

External links
 
 
 

1921 births
1998 deaths
People from Chautauqua County, New York
NASCAR drivers
Racing drivers from New York (state)
NASCAR team owners
NASCAR crew chiefs